The Sobers–Tissera Trophy is a cricket trophy, awarded to the winners of Test series between West Indies and Sri Lanka. It was first awarded following the 2015-16 series between the sides. The trophy is named after Sir Garfield Sobers and Michael Tissera, prominent cricketers of old from the two countries.

The first Sobers–Tissera Trophy was lifted by Sri Lanka in 2015.

Background
The West Indies Cricket Board and Sri Lanka Cricket announced that all future bilateral tours of West Indies and Sri Lanka to be named as Garfield Sobers-Michael Tissera series. Sobers exploits with bat and ball made him regarded as one of the greatest all-rounders in the history of the game. Tissera, a right-hand batsman and leg-spin bowler, played in the same era as Sobers, but his career was limited to playing first-class cricket, as Sri Lanka was not an ICC full member nation and therefore did not play Test cricket, where Tissera lead the Ceylon team to win the famous victory against India in India.

List of Sobers–Tissera Trophy series

Timeline

Match venues

See also
Warne–Muralitharan Trophy

References

External links
 Sobers and Tissera with the trophy

Test cricket competitions
Sri Lanka in international cricket
West Indies in international cricket
Sports trophies and awards
Cricket awards and rankings